Front Royal Recreational Park Historic District, also known as the Front Royal Country Club, is a national historic district located near Front Royal, Warren County, Virginia. The district encompasses 3 contributing buildings, 1 contributing site, 3 contributing structures, and 1 contributing object near the town of Front Royal.  The park was constructed by the Civilian Conservation Corps in 1938.  The historic resources on the property include a garage, and greenskeeper's house, the golf course, the tennis courts, swimming pool, and original shelter, as well as a stone drinking fountain and a stone memorial marker. The property is operated as a public golf course by Warren County. The original clubhouse was lost in the flood of 1996 and rebuilt in 1998.

It was listed on the National Register of Historic Places in 1992.

References

External links

Front Royal Golf Club website

Civilian Conservation Corps in Virginia
Parks on the National Register of Historic Places in Virginia
Historic districts in Warren County, Virginia
Buildings and structures completed in 1938
National Register of Historic Places in Warren County, Virginia
Front Royal, Virginia
Historic districts on the National Register of Historic Places in Virginia